Ricardo Miguel Moreira da Costa (born 16 May 1981) is a Portuguese former professional footballer who played mainly as a central defender but occasionally as a full-back.

After making his senior debut with Porto (where he was only a reserve) he went on to play in Germany, France, Spain, Qatar, Greece and Switzerland mainly spending several years with Valencia in the third country. Over ten seasons, he amassed Primeira Liga totals of 165 matches and seven goals.

A Portugal international since 2005, Costa represented the nation in three World Cups and Euro 2012.

Club career

Porto
Costa, a product of Boavista FC's youth system, was born in Vila Nova de Gaia, Porto District, and moved to neighbours FC Porto when he was still an apprentice. He made his Primeira Liga debut in a 20 January 2002 derby match precisely against Boavista (2–0 away loss, 90 minutes played), but never became more than a fringe player, being preferred in the stopper's pecking order in consecutive seasons to namesake Jorge, Pedro Emanuel, Pepe and Bruno Alves.

On 21 May 2003, Costa came on as an early substitute for injured Costinha during the 2003 UEFA Cup Final in Seville, which ended in a 3–2 win.

Wolfsburg

In July 2007, as first-team opportunities appeared few at Porto, Costa signed with Bundesliga club VfL Wolfsburg on a three-year contract. After a shaky start, he finished the season as an undisputed starter as the side qualified to the UEFA Cup.

Costa scored just 15 seconds after his introduction in a match against Karlsruher SC on 28 September 2008, making it the second-fastest goal ever scored by a substitute. In the summer of 2009, he was about to be transferred to Real Zaragoza, but the deal collapsed after the two parties could not reach an agreement; the move was finally cancelled on 29 July, and the player returned to Wolfsburg.

On 28 January 2010, although he was being used regularly, Costa joined Lille OSC in France.

Valencia
On 17 May 2010, after having contributed relatively to Lille's fourth place in Ligue 1, he moved teams and countries again, joining Valencia CF of Spain on a four-year contract. He scored his first goal on 9 March 2011, putting the Che ahead at FC Schalke 04 in the round of 16 of the UEFA Champions League, a 3–1 defeat (4–2 on aggregate).

In the ensuing off-season, Costa was selected by manager Unai Emery as one of the team's captains. However, things quickly turned sour for the former: he was replaced at half-time of an eventual 4–3 home win against Racing de Santander, and quickly went from first to fourth choice after unflaterring comments directed against his teammates and management.

Later years
Costa left Valencia by mutual consent on 21 July 2014, as his contract was due to expire in June 2015. One week later, he agreed to a two-year deal at Al-Sailiya SC. He scored his first and only goal for the Qatari club on 30 October, in a 4–3 home victory over Al-Wakrah Sport Club.

PAOK FC signed Costa in late January 2015, following a successful medical test. In an interview to Portuguese newspaper A Bola a few months after his transfer, he talked about his experience in Asia by stating: "It was a completely different reality, that I couldn't accept. Everything was so non-professional". During his 12-month tenure he appeared in 37 games all competitions comprised, his only goal coming on 27 August 2015 in a 1–1 draw at Brøndby IF in the play-off round of the Europa League.

Costa returned to Spain and its top division on 1 February 2016, to join Granada CF until June 2017; he vowed to defend his new team "to the death". His first appearance took place six days later, as he played the full 90 minutes in a 1–2 home loss against Real Madrid.

On 5 July 2016, after contributing 14 starts and one goal to his side's eventual survival, Costa had his contract terminated by mutual consent. He resumed his career at FC Luzern in Switzerland days later.

The 36-year-old Costa returned to Portugal after one decade in June 2017, signing a two-year deal at top-flight club C.D. Tondela. On 1 July 2019, he returned to Boavista.

On 13 August 2020, shortly after having announced his retirement, Costa was named sporting director at Boavista. He resigned the following 29 January due to conflicts with the fanbase.

International career

Costa played for Portugal at under-21 level and was also a part of the Olympic team that played in the 2004 Summer Olympics in Athens. A full international since 2005, he was called up to the squad for the 2006 FIFA World Cup, where he appeared against Germany in the 3–1 third-place playoff loss.

On 10 May 2010, national team boss Carlos Queiroz announced a provisional list of 24 players in view for the 2010 World Cup in South Africa, with Costa being included, thus returning to the squad after a four-year absence. He played twice in the tournament, always as right back: in the 0–0 group stage draw against Brazil, and the round-of-16 defeat to Spain (0–1, where he was sent off in the last minute, receiving a three-match ban for his actions).

Costa played and started two games in the 2014 World Cup qualifying campaign. He scored his first and only international goal on 11 October 2013 in a 1–1 home draw against Israel, and was named by manager Paulo Bento in the final 23-man squad for the tournament in Brazil.

On 16 June 2014, Costa became the second Portuguese to play in three World Cups after Cristiano Ronaldo did so in the same match, coming on for the second half of the first group stage match against Germany, a 4–0 loss. He was then selected to replace the suspended Pepe in a 2–2 draw with the United States, making a goal-line clearance from Michael Bradley in the second half.

Career statistics

Club

Honours
Porto
Primeira Liga: 2002–03, 2003–04, 2005–06, 2006–07
Taça de Portugal: 2002–03, 2005–06
Supertaça Cândido de Oliveira: 2003, 2004, 2006
UEFA Champions League: 2003–04
UEFA Cup: 2002–03
Intercontinental Cup: 2004

VfL Wolfsburg
Bundesliga: 2008–09

Orders
Medal of Merit, Order of the Immaculate Conception of Vila Viçosa (House of Braganza)

References

External links

 
 
 
 CiberChe biography and stats 
 
 
 
 

1981 births
Living people
Sportspeople from Vila Nova de Gaia
Portuguese footballers
Association football defenders
Primeira Liga players
Segunda Divisão players
Boavista F.C. players
FC Porto B players
FC Porto players
C.D. Tondela players
Bundesliga players
VfL Wolfsburg players
Ligue 1 players
Lille OSC players
La Liga players
Valencia CF players
Granada CF footballers
Qatar Stars League players
Al-Sailiya SC players
Super League Greece players
PAOK FC players
Swiss Super League players
FC Luzern players
UEFA Champions League winning players
UEFA Cup winning players
Portugal youth international footballers
Portugal under-21 international footballers
Portugal international footballers
2006 FIFA World Cup players
2010 FIFA World Cup players
UEFA Euro 2012 players
2014 FIFA World Cup players
Olympic footballers of Portugal
Footballers at the 2004 Summer Olympics
Portuguese expatriate footballers
Expatriate footballers in Germany
Expatriate footballers in France
Expatriate footballers in Spain
Expatriate footballers in Qatar
Expatriate footballers in Greece
Expatriate footballers in Switzerland
Portuguese expatriate sportspeople in Germany
Portuguese expatriate sportspeople in France
Portuguese expatriate sportspeople in Spain
Portuguese expatriate sportspeople in Qatar
Portuguese expatriate sportspeople in Greece
Portuguese expatriate sportspeople in Switzerland